Chasing the Grail is the fourth studio album from the heavy metal band Fozzy, released on January 26, 2010. It is their first album since the release of All That Remains five years prior, and is their first and only album as a four-piece.

Background 
In March 2009, the band announced that Riot Entertainment had signed the group to a worldwide deal for the release of a new album.  According to guitarist Rich Ward, Riot is the only label worthy of releasing the album.  According to lead vocalist Chris Jericho, "For the first time, Fozzy has a ballad on the album and a 14-minute prog rock-inspired tune called 'Wormwood'".  According to Jericho, the song 'Broken Soul' is a "'70s-type Southern rock-type ballady-type tune". In June 2009, the band was finishing the last details of the album.

Release and reception 
The album was released through Riot! on January 26. The album did not chart on the Billboard 200, it did however, chart on the Heatseekers Album charts, reaching # 6 at its peak. The album sold a little over 2000 copies in its first week.

Singles

Martyr No More 
On September 8, 2009, the band released the first material from the album, "Martyr No More", along with the album art and a release date of January 26, 2010.

"Martyr No More" was used as one of the official theme songs for the 2010 WWE Royal Rumble pay per view.

Let the Madness Begin 
On October 16, 2009, the band released the second single from the album, entitled "Let the Madness Begin".

Rich Ward on "Let the Madness Begin"

"[That particular track] is all about the balance between a really good, classic melody and a great, classic rock riff. That was our focus for the whole record, but I think 'Let the Madness Begin' is probably the one song on the album where I think that balance is best.

"Sometimes when you're trying to write a heavy album, you find that sometimes you'll end up compromising the melody for the riff because obviously, the riff is so important for the drum part. On some rock albums, the vocals become the focus, and then the music takes a backseat. We tried to find that fine line where the music was important and the melody was important. We treated them as equals, and I think 'Let the Madness Begin' was that perfect balance between hard rock melodic vocals and a big metal riff."

On July 22, Fozzy released the music video for their second single, "Let the Madness Begin", which was a compilation of the band performing the song from multiple concerts in the U.S. and U.K. in the early portion on 2010.

Broken Soul 
In March 2010, Fozzy released their third single, "Broken Soul".

Track listing

Charts

Personnel

Musicians
 Chris Jericho – lead vocals
 Rich Ward – guitar, backing vocals
 Sean Delson – bass
 Frank Fontsere – drums

Additional Musicians
 Eric Frampton – Piano, Hammond organ & keyboards
 Renny Carroll (Forever Never) Harmony backing vocals
 Jeff Waters – Guitar solos on "Martyr No More" and "God Pounds His Nails"
 Mike Martin – Producer, all guitars and backing vocals on "Wormwood"
 Lord Nelson – Revelator on "Wormwood"
 Rosemary Serpa, John Martin, Mike Martin, Sarah Martin, Tiffany Martin, Sophia Martin, Danny Messier and Katie Messier @ St. Michael's Episcopal Charleston, SC – Choir vocals on "Wormwood"

References

External links
 Fozzy Official website
 Riot Entertainment official website

2010 albums
Fozzy albums